Quatt Malvern is a civil parish in Shropshire, England.  It contains 15 listed buildings that are recorded in the National Heritage List for England.  Of these, three are listed at Grade II*, the middle of the three grades, and the others are at Grade II, the lowest grade.  The parish contains the village of Quatt and the surrounding countryside.  In the parish is the country house, Dudmaston Hall, which is listed, together with associated structures.  The other listing buildings include a church, farmhouses, houses and cottages, a vicarage, a war memorial, and a telephone kiosk.


Key

Buildings

References

Citations

Sources

Lists of buildings and structures in Shropshire